Emily Elizabeth Veeder (Ferris; 1841 – April 27, 1898) was an American novelist and poet. Her published works were Her Brother Donnard (1891), and In the Garden and Other Poems (1894). Her Brother Donnard proved her gift as a story-teller. Although this book was her first, the second edition was bought out within a year. Among her most popular poems were "The Twilight Hour," "In My Dreams," and "A Voice." She wrote after having become infirm in a railway accident. Veeder died in 1898.

Early life and education
Emily Elizabeth Ferris was born in 1841, in the valley of Lake Champlain, in New York. On one side of the family, she was the granddaughter of Judge McOmlier. Her paternal grandmother was a poet. Bishop Daniel Ayres Goodsell was her cousin.

Veeder was a student in Packer Collegiate Institute, Brooklyn, New York. She wrote verses at the age of nine, but it was the direct influence of her brother-in-law, Asahel Stearns, a professor of law, and of the notable people who gathered about him and her sister, which elevated her taste for literature and rendered it absorbing. Her culture was increased by travel and by contact with many others. She married Herman Veeder, on September 28, 1876.

Career
Her first book was Her Brother Donnard (Philadelphia, 1891).  Veeder occasionally contributed verses to prominent periodicals. Her first appearance with a collected volume of poetry, however, was in the book to which the first poem, "In The Garden", gave its title (1895). She arranged several of her poems to music of her own composition. Much of the time, she was exhausted by her disability. In her hours of pain, she rose above physical suffering and her habitual temper was buoyant and helpful. She possessed originality and piquancy. A keen observation of human nature and a nice discrimination of character give point to her conversation and her literary work. She was very facile with anecdotes. Some of her purely outdoor work shows her genuine love of nature; while in her versified story, "Entranced", her narrative power stood out, and her "Austin's Painting of Christ" revealed the true devotional bent of her mind.

In private life, Veeder was eminently practical. She was a member of the Woman's Press Club of Pittsburgh, in which city she resided until she visited the World's Columbian Exposition (1893). During that visit, she received injuries (consequent to a railway accident) which kept her in Chicago thereafter. At the Authors' Congress of the Columbian Exposition, Veeder originated and introduced the idea of an Author's Institute, which she hoped to establish in Chicago.

Critical reception

Her Brother Donnard (J. B. Lippincott Co.) was reviewed in 1891 by The Literary World (1891):—

In the Garden, and Other Poems was reviewed in 1895 by the Boston Courier:—

In the Garden was also reviewed in 1895 by Munsey's Magazine:—

References

Bibliography

External links
 
 
 Various poems by Emily Elizabeth Veeder at The Magazine of Poetry and Literary Review

1841 births
19th-century American novelists
19th-century American poets
19th-century American women writers
Year of death missing
Novelists from New York (state)
American people with disabilities
Wikipedia articles incorporating text from A Woman of the Century